Virginia's 14th House of Delegates district elects one of 100 seats in the Virginia House of Delegates, the lower house of the state's bicameral legislature. District 14 represents the city of Danville and parts of Henry and Pittsylvania counties. The seat is currently held by Daniel W. Marshall III.

District officeholders

Electoral history

References

014
Danville, Virginia
Henry County, Virginia
Pittsylvania County, Virginia